Elaeocyma plicata is an extinct species of sea snail, a marine gastropod mollusk in the family Drilliidae.

Description

Distribution
This extinct species was found in strata of the Eocene of the United Kingdom; age range: 37.2 to 33.9 Ma; in strata of the Lutetian in France.

References

 Cossmann (M.), 1896 Essais de Paléoconchologie comparée (2ème livraison), pp. 1–179
 J.-M. Pacaud and J. Le Renard. 1995. Révision des Mollusques Paléogénes du Bassin de Paris. IV - Liste systématique actualisée. Cossmanniana 3(4):155-187

External links
 International Fossil Shell Museum: image of Elaeocyma plicata
 Muséum National d'Histoire naturelle: Elaeocyma plicata

plicata
Gastropods described in 1803